Burgruine Wolkenstein is a high medieval castle in Styria, Austria.

See also
List of castles in Austria

References

This article was initially translated from the German Wikipedia.

Castles in Styria

de:Burgruine Wolkenstein